Döllstädt station is a railway station in the municipality of Döllstädt, located in the Gotha district in Thuringia, Germany.

References

Railway stations in Thuringia
Buildings and structures in Gotha (district)